The Southern Waiotauru River is a river of New Zealand. It joins with the Eastern Waiotauru (Snowy) River to become the Waiotauru River, a tributary of the Ōtaki River.

See also
List of rivers of New Zealand

References

Rivers of the Wellington Region
Rivers of New Zealand